Well is a village of about 2500 residents in the municipality of Bergen in the province of Limburg in the southeastern part of the Netherlands. The town is located between Nijmegen and Venlo, it's east to the town of Venray. The village of Well can be reached via public transport by using bus line 83 or 81.

Localities
Nearby attractions include Thermaalbad Arcen, and The Maasduinen, situated close to the German border (Weeze municipality in North Rhine-Westphalia) and a medieval castle in Well itself, this castle is closed to the public.

Kasteel Well
Kasteel Well is where Emerson College's European Center is located, which attracts approximately eighty-five (predominantly American) students twice a year.

Gallery

See also

 Population centres in the municipality of Bergen
 Weeze#Culture and tourism

References

Populated places in Limburg (Netherlands)
Bergen, Limburg